Lévis—Lotbinière (formerly Lotbinière—Chutes-de-la-Chaudière) is a federal electoral district in the province of Quebec, Canada, that has been represented in the House of Commons of Canada since 2004.

It was created in 2003 from parts of Lévis-et-Chutes-de-la-Chaudière and Lotbinière—L'Érable ridings.

Geography

Located southwest of Quebec City along the Saint Lawrence River, the riding includes parts of the city's south shore suburbs.

It consists of:
 the Regional County Municipality of Lotbinière;
 the part of the City of Lévis comprising: the former cities of Saint-Nicolas, Charny, Saint-Jean-Chrysostome and Saint-Rédempteur, the former Municipality of Saint-Étienne-de-Lauzon, and the former Parish Municipality of Sainte-Hélène-de-Breakeyville; and
 the Parish Municipality of Saint-Lambert-de-Lauzon in the Regional County Municipality of La Nouvelle-Beauce.

The neighbouring ridings are Bellechasse—Les Étchemins—Lévis, Beauce, Mégantic—L'Érable, Bas-Richelieu—Nicolet—Bécancour, Portneuf—Jacques-Cartier, and  Louis-Hébert.

As per the 2012 federal electoral redistribution, this riding was renamed Lévis—Lotbinière, its territory will remain largely the same, but received a small portion from Mégantic—L'Érable.

Members of Parliament

This riding has elected the following Members of Parliament:

Election results

Lévis—Lotbinière, 2013 Representation Order

This riding was renamed Lévis—Lotbinière, and received a small portion of territory from Mégantic—L'Érable for the 42nd Canadian federal election.

Lotbinière—Chutes-de-la-Chaudière, 2003 Representation Order

See also
 List of Canadian federal electoral districts
 Past Canadian electoral districts

References

Campaign expense data from Elections Canada
2011 Results from Elections Canada
Riding history from the Library of Parliament

Notes

Politics of Lévis, Quebec
Quebec federal electoral districts
Quebec City Area